Myroslava Ivanivna Zamoiska, known by her pen name Dara Korniy, is a Ukrainian writer of urban fantasy.

Biography
Korniy was born in the village of Sekun, in the Kovel Raion, Volyn Oblast. She graduated from Knyazhe Village High School, Lviv Oblast. She obtained higher education in Lviv, graduating from the editorial journalism department of the Ukrainian Academy of Printing. She works at the Lviv National Academy of Arts.

Korniy lives in Lviv. She has two children, Daryna and Maxym.

References

1970 births
Living people
People from Volyn Oblast
Ukrainian children's writers
20th-century Ukrainian women writers
21st-century Ukrainian women writers